Randolph/Market was a station on the Chicago "L"'s Lake Street Elevated, serving its Market Street stub between the main line and the Market Street Terminal. It was the only intermediate station on the Market Street stub, and on any of Chicago's terminal stubs. It opened with the rest of the Elevated on November 6, 1893. After the Loop was built downtown, only overflow and express services ran on the Market Street stub. The stub, and Randolph station, closed on April 5, 1948, and was demolished shortly afterwards.

References

Defunct Chicago "L" stations